Nicholas Kotsiras (born 13 March 1959, in Greece) is an Australian politician, and was a member of the Victorian Legislative Assembly for the Liberal Party from 1999 to 2014. He was first elected after defeating former member David Perrin for Liberal preselection in 1999.

Kotsiras is a Collingwood Magpies and a South Melbourne FC supporter.

References

 Maiden speech
 

1959 births
Living people
Liberal Party of Australia members of the Parliament of Victoria
Politicians from Melbourne
Members of the Victorian Legislative Assembly
Greek emigrants to Australia